An Evening with Silk Sonic at Park MGM is a concert residency held at the Dolby Live theater, Park MGM in Las Vegas by American R&B superduo Silk Sonic, composed of recording artists Bruno Mars and Anderson .Paak. The concert residency was promoted by Live Nation and MGM Resorts.

Background and development
On January 19, 2022, Silk Sonic announced they would be performing 13 shows at the Dolby Live theater, Park MGM in Las Vegas between February 25, 2022 and April 2, 2022. Later, the duo added 12 shows in May. On May 10, 2022, more shows were added for August.

Reception
The set was nominated for Favorite Residency at the 2023 iHeartRadio Music Awards.

Setlist
The following setlist is representative of the show on February 25, 2022.

 "Silk Sonic Intro"
 "777"
 "Skate"
 "We Took Your Phones Away"
 "Love's Train"
 "That's What I Like"
 "Am I Wrong"
 "Treasure"
 "Everybody Loves the Sunshine"

 "Fly as Me"
 "Smokin out the Window"
 "Put on a Smile" / "Make It Better" / "When I Was Your Man"
 "After Last Night"
 "Come Down"
 "Runaway Baby"
 "Pure Imagination"
 "Blast Off"
 "Leave the Door Open"

Shows

References

Concert residencies in the Las Vegas Valley
Bruno Mars
Park MGM
2022 concert residencies